Facing East from Indian Country: A Native History of Early America is a work of Native American history by historian Daniel K. Richter that investigates the settlement of North America by Europeans from the perspective of American Indians. The book was a Pulitzer Prize finalist in 2002.

Synopsis
Facing East begins by exploring, through available facts, possibilities of American Indian scenarios that have not been part of European-centered imaginations about American Indians. Richter goes on to show the active participation of American Indians in relations with European settlers, particularly their responses to "abstract material responses" brought about by European colonization. The figures Pocahontas, Tekakwitha, and Metacom are brought together in an analysis that shows their similar but varying deliberate involvements with Europeans. Richter relies on spiritual autobiographies and conversion narratives on American Natives by European colonists to elucidate an Indian point of view. Richter argues that American Indian participation in the Atlantic economy and warfare was essential and that Europeans and American Indians depended on each other. According to Richter, with the increasing animosity between American Indians and colonists, both groups developed their mindsets about each other.

Reception
Facing East received generally positive reviews and was praised for its writing style and argumentation. Gail D. MacLeitch in the Journal of World History, notes the importance of the work in addressing a lack of research on Native American history from their perspective and praises the book's subtle, adept and imaginative writing style. In the Journal of Social History, Nancy Shoemaker writes, "Facing East from Indian Country will appeal to non-specialists, a general public, and students as well as to scholars in the field. It is precisely the kind of book that could succeed at realizing Richter’s longstanding crusade to earn for American Indian history a vital place in the larger narrative of American history."

References

External Links
Limited Preview of Facing East from Indian Country

Books about Native American history
Non-fiction books about Native Americans
2001 non-fiction books
Harvard University Press books